Kelu may refer to:
 Kelu, Estonia
 Kelu, Semnan, Iran